Mark Anthony Chaloner (born 23 May 1972, in Nocton, Lincolnshire) is a male retired professional squash player from England.

Squash career
Chaloner was a member of the England team which won the World Team Squash Championships in 1995, and reached a career-high world ranking of World No. 7 in 2001. He won a gold medal for England in the men's doubles at the 1998 Commonwealth Games in Kuala Lumpur, (partnering Paul Johnson).<. He was elected President of the Professional Squash Association (PSA) in 2002.

References

External links 
 SquashSite article on Chaloner's retirement
 
 
 

1972 births
Living people
English male squash players
Commonwealth Games gold medallists for England
Commonwealth Games bronze medallists for England
Commonwealth Games medallists in squash
Squash players at the 1998 Commonwealth Games
Squash players at the 2002 Commonwealth Games
Medallists at the 1998 Commonwealth Games
Medallists at the 2002 Commonwealth Games